Yogi Adityanath (born Ajay Singh Bisht; 5 June 1972) is an Indian Hindu monk and politician who is serving as the 21st and current Chief Minister of Uttar Pradesh since 19 March 2017. A member of the Bharatiya Janata Party and the RSS, Adityanath is known for being on the far right of Indian politics.

He was appointed the Chief Minister of Uttar Pradesh on 26 March 2017 after the Bharatiya Janata Party (BJP) won the 2017 State Assembly elections in which he was a prominent campaigner. The BJP also won the 2022 State Assembly elections: Adityanath continued as Chief Minister, becoming the first chief minister of Uttar Pradesh to return to power after completing a 5-year term in office.

Currently, he is the member of legislative assembly from Gorakhpur Urban for the second term as a chief minister (from 2022). He contested the 2022 state assembly election from Gorakhpur urban and won with huge margin of votes. Adityanath previously was the member of legislative council during his first tenure as chief minister (2017-2022). He resigned from the legislative council after being elected to the legislative assembly.

He is a former Member of Parliament, Lok Sabha from Gorakhpur constituency, Uttar Pradesh, for five consecutive terms from 1998 to 2017 before he resigned to become the Chief Minister.

Adityanath is also the mahant (Head Priest) of the Gorakhnath Math, a Hindu monastery in Gorakhpur, a position he has held since September 2014 following the death of Mahant Avaidyanath, his spiritual "father". He is also the founder of Hindu Yuva Vahini, a Hindu nationalist organisation. He has an image of a Hindutva nationalist and a social conservative.

Early life and education
Yogi Adityanath was born as Ajay Mohan Singh Bisht on 5 June 1972 in the village of Panchur, in Pauri Garhwal, Uttar Pradesh (now in Uttarakhand) in a Rajput family. His late father, Anand Singh Bisht, was a forest ranger.
He was the second born in the family, among four brothers and three sisters. He completed his bachelor's degree in mathematics from the Hemwati Nandan Bahuguna Garhwal University in Uttarakhand.

He left his home around the 1990s to join the Ayodhya Ram temple movement. Around that time, he also became a disciple of Mahant Avaidyanath, the chief of the Gorakhnath Math. Mahant Avaidyanath was leading the Ayodhya Ram temple movement at that time. While based in Gorakhpur after his initiation, Adityanath has often visited his ancestral village, establishing a school there in 1998.

Adityanath was promoted to the rank of Mahant or high priest of the Gorakhnath Math after the death of Avaidyanath on 12 September 2014. He was made Peethadhishwar (Head Seer) of the Math amid traditional rituals of the Nath sect two days later.

Early political career
Yogi Adityanath belongs to a specific tradition of Hindutva politics in Uttar Pradesh that can be traced back to the Mahant Digvijay Nath, who led the placing of idols in the Babri Masjid in Ayodhya on 22 December 1949. Both Digvijay Nath and his successor Avaidyanath belonged to the Hindu Mahasabha and were elected to the Parliament on that party's ticket. After the BJP and the Sangh Parivar joined the Ayodhya movement in the 1980s, the two strands of Hindu nationalism came together. Avaidyanath switched to the BJP in 1991, but nevertheless maintained significant autonomy. Four years after Adityanath was designated Avaidyanath's successor, he was elected to the Lower House of the Indian Parliament (the Lok Sabha).

After his first electoral win, Adityanath started his own youth organisation Hindu Yuva Vahini, which came to be known for its activities in the eastern Uttar Pradesh and was instrumental in Adityanath's meteoric rise. There have been recurrent tensions between Adityanath and the BJP leadership over the allocation of election tickets. However, the BJP has not let the tensions mount because Adityanath has served as a star campaigner for the party.

In 2006, he took up links between Nepali Maoists and Indian Leftist parties as a key campaign issue and encouraged Madhesi leaders to oppose Maoism in Nepal. In 2008, his convoy was reportedly attacked while en route to Azamgarh for an anti-terrorism rally. The attack left one person dead and at least six persons injured.

In January 2007, Adityanath with other BJP leaders had gathered to mourn the death of a man who was killed because of religious violence. He and his supporters were subsequently arrested by the police and lodged in Gorkhapur jail on the charges of disturbing peace and violating prohibitory orders. His arrest led to further unrest during which several coaches of the Mumbai bound Mumbai-Gorakhpur Godan Express were burnt, allegedly by protesting Hindu Yuva Vahini activists. The day after the arrest, the District Magistrate and the local police chief were transferred and replaced.

Member of Parliament
Adityanath was the youngest member of the 12th Lok Sabha at 26. He was elected to the Parliament from Gorakhpur for five consecutive terms (in 1998, 1999, 2004, 2009 and 2014 elections).

Adityanath's attendance in Lok Sabha was 77% and he has asked 284 questions, participated in 56 debates and introduced three private member Bills in the 16th Lok Sabha.

Relations with the BJP
Adityanath has had strained relations with the BJP for more than a decade.
He often derided and undermined the BJP, criticising its dilution of the Hindutva ideology.
Having established his own independent power base in Eastern Uttar Pradesh, with the support of the Hindu Yuva Vahini and the Gorakhnath Math, he felt confident to be able to dictate terms to the BJP. When his voice was not heard, he revolted by fielding candidates against the official BJP candidates. The most prominent example was the fielding of Radha Mohan Das Agarwal from Gorakhpur on a Hindu Mahasabha ticket in 2002, who then defeated BJP Cabinet minister, Shiv Pratap Shukla by a wide margin. In 2007, Adityanath threatened to field 70 candidates for the state assembly against the BJP candidates. But he reached a compromise in the end.
In 2009 Parliamentary elections, Adityanath was rumoured to have campaigned against the BJP candidates who were then defeated.

Despite his periodic revolts, Yogi Adityanath has been kept in good humour by the RSS and the BJP leaders. The deputy prime minister L. K. Advani, the RSS chief Rajendra Singh and the VHP chief Ashok Singhal have visited him in Gorakhpur. During 22–24 December 2006, Adityanath organised a three-day Virat Hindu Mahasammelan at Gorakhpur at the same time as the BJP National Executive Meet in Lucknow. Despite the conflict, several RSS and VHP leaders attended the Mahasammelan, which issued a commitment to pursue the Hindutva goals despite the BJP's claimed "abandonment" of them.

In March 2010, Adityanath was one of the several BJP MPs who defied the
party whip on the Women's Reservation Bill in the Parliament.

In 2018, he campaigned for BJP candidate Pratap Puriji Maharaj for Rajasthan state assembly election.

Chief Minister of UP

Adityanath was a prominent campaigner for the BJP in the 2017 assembly elections in the state of Uttar Pradesh. The state government   appointed him Chief Minister on 18 March 2017; he was sworn in the next day, after the BJP won the assembly elections.

Ministry allocation 

After becoming a Chief Minister of Uttar Pradesh, Adityanath kept around 36 ministries under his direct control, including Home, Housing, Town and country planning department, Revenue, Food and Civil Supplies, Food Security and drug administration, Economics and statistics, Mines and Minerals, Flood control, Stamp and registry, Prison, General administration, Secretariat administration, Vigilance, Personnel and appointment, Information, Institutional finance, Planning, Estate department, Urban land, UP state reorganisation committee, Administration reforms, Programme implementation, National integration, Infrastructure, Coordination, Language, External aided project, Relief and Rehabilitation, Public Service Management, Rent Control, Consumer protection and Weights and measures.

For India's Independence Day celebrations in 2017, his government singled out Muslim religious schools, requiring them to provide video evidence that their students had sung the Indian national anthem.

Law and order 

In 2017, his government ordered withdrawal of around 20,000 "politically motivated" cases, including those against himself and other politicians.

Adityanath ordered the forming of quasi-vigilante anti-"romeo" squads. He imposed a blanket ban on cow-smuggling and a stay on UPPSC civil service exam results, exams and interviews until further order. He imposed a ban on the vices of tobacco, paan and gutka in government offices across the state, and compelled officials to pledge to devote 100 hours every year for the Swachh Bharat Mission. More than 100 "black sheep" policemen were suspended by the Uttar Pradesh police.

Since 2017 chief minister Adityanath had ordered the closing of many slaughterhouses. As a direct consequence, the tanneries that sourced raw leather from the slaughterhouses were impacted. Several tanneries were also ordered to be shut down. The tannery industry was estimated to be worth 50,0000 crore ₹ in 2017. The industry directly or indirectly gave employment to more than 10 lakh people. Since 2018, through executive orders, CM Adityanath had closed around 200 tanneries out of a total of more than 400 that were active in Jajamau, Kanpur.

In the first 10 months of his first term, he conducted four police encounters per day. National human rights commission issued a notice to the state government and a bench of three judges from the Supreme Court of India warned and issued notice to the Uttar Pradesh government in this case.

Committee Against Assault on Journalists found that 138 cases of persecution of journalists were registered under Yogi Adityanath's term in Uttar Pradesh between 2017 and February 2022.

After the Citizenship Amendment Act protests in Uttar Pradesh, he put up hoardings with names, photographs and addresses of protestors. Only after the order of the High Court, which called his government's action "shameless" and an "unwarranted interference in privacy", the posters were removed.

Recent NCRB data has revealed that crimes against women and children have significantly reduced under the Yogi Adityanath administration. 378 cases of communal violence were registered across the country, of which just one case was registered in Uttar Pradesh. According to the data, 18,943 cases were registered for crime against children in Uttar Pradesh in 2019 and it came down to 16,838 in 2021. The cases of crime against women decreased from 59,853 in 2019 to 56,083 in 2021. Crime against women have decreased by 6.2% in 2021 compared to 2019. There has been a decrease of 11.11% in crimes against children. The cybercrime too has decreased in the state. In 2019, 11,416 cases of cybercrime were registered, which went down to 8,829 in 2021, registering a fall of 22.6%.

Infrastructure development 
In July 2018, Adityanath, along with Prime Minister Narendra Modi and Moon Jae-in, president of South Korea, inaugurated the world's largest smartphone manufacturing factory in Noida, Uttar Pradesh. His government was credited for making 50 megawatts of power and a 22-km-long electricity line in a record four months for the Samsung mobile plant.

In November 2019, Uttar Pradesh government along with Ministry of Defense laid the foundation stone of Defence Industrial Corridor project in Jhansi. Yogi Adityanath held consultations with private firms in order to increase private investment in the defense corridor project.

The New York Times relayed analysts' estimations of Adityanath as a candidate for Prime Minister of India in 2024, provided he "delivers on some fronts". In August 2020, India Today's "Mood of the nation" survey showed Adityanath as the best-performing chief minister in India.

Ordinance and bills 
In September 2020, Adityanath asked his government to devise a strategy to prevent "religious conversions in the name of love", and even considered passing an ordinance for the same if needed.  On 31 October, Adityanath announced that a Prohibition of Unlawful Religious Conversion Ordinance, 2020 to curb "Love Jihad" would be passed by his government.

The Uttar Pradesh state cabinet cleared Adityanath's ordinance on 24 November 2020. following which it was approved and signed by state Governor Anandiben Patel on 28 November 2020.

In July 2021, Adityanath introduced the UP population control draft bill 2021–2030. On the event of World Population Day, the chief minister unveiled the policy on reducing the population growth for the forthcoming years. There were also several benefits announced based on the laid single child and two-child policies. He said the state population policy focused on efforts to increase the accessibility of contraceptive measures issued under the Family Planning Programme and provide a proper system for safe abortion. This policy also received lots of reactions and criticisms from other political parties. It was said that this policy mainly focused on the upcoming general elections in the state. The opposition Congress in the state has called it a "political agenda" and the Samajwadi Party said it is "murder of democracy".

Second term (2022–present) 

On 10 March 2022, with the announcement of the legislative assembly results, BJP-led NDA alliance secured 273 seats with incumbent Chief minister Yogi getting his second term. Yogi and his party wrote history, being the first chief minister to return to power, after completing a full 5-year term in office. BJP is also the first party to return to power consecutively after 37 years. He was only the third chief minister, in the history of Uttar Pradesh's political history to complete a full 5-year term as the chief minister of the state after Mayawati of BSP and Akhilesh Yadav belonging to the Samajwadi Party.

In the buildup to the assembly elections, Yogi successfully used a campaign with a bulldozer as its main image, earning him the tag "bulldozer baba". The term had initially been used as a taunt by an opposition party. His speeches during the polls included hate speeches against Muslims, promoting religious polarization and Hindu supremacy. Further, his speeches included the idea that rights of Hindus are at odds with that of Muslims, where he repeatedly conflated Muslims with terrorists and criminals, and the opposition parties as appeasers of Muslims.

Personal views
He identifies himself as a staunch Hindu Yogi and Anti-Muslim. On 3 January 2016, a day after the terrorist attack on an Indian air force base in Pathankot allegedly by Pakistani terrorists, Adityanath compared Pakistan to Satan.

Adityanath had praised the then US President Donald Trump's decision to enact a ban on citizens from 7 Muslim-majority countries entering the United States and has called for India to adopt similar policies to tackle terrorism.

Controversies 
In 2010, when opposing the Women's Reservation Bill, Adityanath said that reservation doesn't affect women's domestic responsibilities such as childcare. He added that if men develop feminine traits they become gods, but if women develop masculine traits they become demons.

In an undated video that surfaced on YouTube during August 2014, Adityanath, reportedly during a public speech at Azamgarh, referring to the religious conversions due to inter-religious marriages, has said, "if they take one Hindu girl, we will take 100 Muslims girls." In the same video, he continues by saying, "if they kill one Hindu, there will be 100 that we" and pauses, as the gathered crowd shouts: "kill".

In February 2015, while speaking at the Vishwa Hindu Parishad's 'Virat Hindu Sammelan', Adityanath commented: "If given a chance, we will install statues of Goddess Gauri, Ganesh and Nandi " — Hindu deities — "in every mosque."

In June 2015, Adityanath, while talking about Surya Namaskara, and Yoga said that those who want to avoid Yoga can leave Hindustan. He "requested" those who see communalism in the Sun God to "drown themselves in the sea" or live in a dark room for the rest of their lives.

During the intolerance debate in the Indian media in late 2015, Adityanath commented that actor Shah Rukh Khan was using the same "language" as Pakistani terrorist Hafiz Saeed.

In February 2020, he said publicly, "Muslims who chose to stay in India when it was partitioned following independence from Britain did the country 'no favours.

In 2020, during Shaheen Bagh protests, he said "If they won't understand words, they'll understand bullets."

In June 2021, he was accused of cursing an ANI reporter, though ANI refused to comment, but later allegations found not to be true.

Bibliography
Haṭhayoga svarūpa evam sādhanā, Gorakhapura : Śrī Gorakshanātha Mandira, 2007, 148 p. On Hatha yoga.

See also

First Yogi Adityanath ministry
Second Yogi Adityanath ministry
List of Chief Ministers of Uttar Pradesh
Gorakhpur Urban Assembly constituency
The Monk Who Became Chief Minister
Yogi Adityanath: The Rise of a Saffron Socialist

Notes

References

Citations

Sources

Further reading

External links

 

|-

 
1972 births
Living people
Garhwali people
Bharatiya Janata Party politicians from Uttar Pradesh
Chief ministers from Bharatiya Janata Party
Chief Ministers of Uttar Pradesh
Lok Sabha members from Uttar Pradesh
Members of the Uttar Pradesh Legislative Council
Far-right politicians in India
Indian Hindus
People from Gorakhpur
India MPs 1998–1999
India MPs 1999–2004
India MPs 2004–2009
India MPs 2009–2014
India MPs 2014–2019
Uttar Pradesh MLAs 2022–2027